Greg Kotis (born 1965/1966) is an American playwright, best known for writing the book and co-writing the lyrics for the musical Urinetown.

Biography

Career

Kotis studied political science at the University of Chicago, where he was a member of the improvisational and sketch comedy group Off-Off Campus. He dropped out when he took a course on the Short Comic Scene, realizing that he wanted to be part of the theatre industry instead. Kotis became a member of the Cardiff Giant Theatre Company and the Neo-Futurists. He moved to New York City in 1995 where he established a branch of the Neo-Futurists together with his wife Ayun Halliday. While moonlighting in fringe theater, Kotis worked as a location scout for the show Law & Order.

Urinetown

By 1998, Kotis had a daughter with his wife, and thus the responsibility of supporting a family. Kotis began writing Urinetown: The Musical, deciding it would be his last work:

"I told myself, I tried to find a life in the theater and we had some fun...it was time to move on. The theater life, particularly our theater life, wasn't making us any money. I would just stick to location scouting and apply myself to making money. With 'Urinetown,' I thought, 'Let's just have one last big laugh.' "

Kotis had gotten the idea for Urinetown when, on an ill-budgeted visit to Paris in 1995, he had to limit his trips to the city's prevalent pay toilets.  Urinetown the Musical received ten Tony Award nominations: Best Director, Best Original Score, Best Book of a Musical, Best Musical, Best Actor in a Musical, two nominations for Best Actress in a Musical (Nancy Opel and Jennifer Laura Thompson), Best Featured Actress in a Musical, Best Choreography, and Best Orchestration. Urinetown has been performed around the world and in hundreds of American cities.

Other Works
He produced the play Pig Farm, which premiered at The Roundabout Theatre in New York City in June 2006.

He is also working on a sequel to the musical Urinetown with his theatrical partner Mark Hollmann titled Yeast Nation.

Personal life
Kotis married his wife, writer and actor Ayun Halliday, in 1995. They have two children, India (born 1997) and Milo (born 2000). They reside in East Harlem.

References

External links

Biography at americantheatrewing.org

1960s births
20th-century American dramatists and playwrights
20th-century American male writers
21st-century American dramatists and playwrights
21st-century American male writers
American musical theatre lyricists
Broadway composers and lyricists
Living people
Tony Award winners
University of Chicago alumni
Year of birth missing (living people)